Antara (Quechua for a kind of pan flute) is a   mountain in the Andes of Peru. It is situated in the Huancavelica Region, Huaytará Province,  Pilpichaca District. It lies southeast of Wakan Q'allay and Qispi Q'awa. The peaks northeast and northwest of Antara are named Willani and Q'illu Urqu.

References

Mountains of Peru
Mountains of Huancavelica Region